Marquess of Suffolk may refer to: 

William de la Pole, 1st Duke of Suffolk (1396–1450)
Earl of Suffolk, a title that has been created four times in the Peerage of England